Sheila Mary Fraser (25 November 1920 – 29 August 2000) was an English actress. She is best known for her roles in the television serial A Family at War (1970–1971) and as Luke Skywalker's aunt Beru in Star Wars (1977).

Early life
Shelagh Fraser was born in Purley, Surrey, on 25 November 1920. Her parents were John Newton Mappin Fraser and Vera Eleanor (née Beardshaw). Her father was a director of the  jewelry company Mappin & Webb, and the family was sent to Australia to establish a branch of the family business there. They returned to the United Kingdom in 1924. 

As a child, Shelagh suffered from spinal tuberculosis, but overcame the debilitating effects of the illness. She was educated at St Christopher's School in Kingswood and won a scholarship to train as an actor at Croydon Repertory Theatre Drama School. It was there that Fraser made her first stage appearance in 1938.

Career
Fraser had a wide range of roles on the stage. She made her West End theatre debut in 1944 at the Comedy Theatre as Effie in This Was a Woman. She went on to play Mabel Crumm in While the Sun Shines (1945), Hetty, in Call Home the Heart (1947), Lady Orreyd in a revival of The Second Mrs Tanqueray (1950). She took roles in a number of plays in the 1960s and 70s by noted contemporary playwrights such as the role of Flora in Harold Pinter's A Slight Ache, Delia in Alan Ayckbourn's Bedroom Farce, Martha in Edward Albee's Who's Afraid Of Virginia Woolf?, and Amanda Wingfield in The Glass Menagerie by Tennessee Williams.

In 1978 she appeared as Mrs. Wilson, a respectable lady who becomes embroiled in a conspiracy to obtain the release of underworld crime boss Bill Hayden in an episode of the hard-hitting British police drama The Professionals, the episode entitled When the Heat Cools Off.

In cinema, Fraser often played demure character roles in films such as the Master of Bankdam (1947) and Raising a Riot (1955), although she is also remembered for her roles as the vulgar Mrs Orreyd in the 1952 film The Second Mrs Tanqueray. In the 1970s she took one of her best-known roles as Jean Ashton, the embattled mother of a wartime family in Liverpool in the television serial A Family at War. In 1977 she played the part of Beru Lars, the aunt of Luke Skywalker, in the science fiction blockbuster Star Wars. In his casting notes, writer and director George Lucas wrote, "A little British, but okay". Fraser took part in location filming in Matmata, Tunisia, and her voice was later recorded at home for additional wild track lines and dialogue dubbing.

Fraser appeared in more than 50 films and TV shows during her career, including Z-Cars; Softly, Softly; A Family at War; The Professionals and Heartbeat on television, and such films as The Witches, Till Death Us Do Part, The Body Stealers, Doomwatch and Hope and Glory. She was a member of the BBC Repertory Company and appeared in over 500 BBC Radio plays.

In the 1950, Fraser began to write for the theatre, and in the 1970s, she wrote two children's books, Captain Johnny and Princess Tai Lue. Building on her experience in radio, she also worked as a radio dramatist, and wrote her own radio play, The Maid's Room, about the relationship between a servant and her mistress. She also adapted Rose Macauley's novel The World My Wilderness and Rebecca West's  short story "The Salt of the Earth" for BBC Radio 4.

Personal life
Fraser was married and divorced from Anthony Squire. She was the sister of ballerina/actress Moyra Fraser.

Selected filmography

Film

Television

References

External links

1920 births
2000 deaths
English film actresses
English television actresses
People from Purley, London
20th-century English actresses
English radio actresses
English children's writers
English dramatists and playwrights
20th-century British women writers
Writers from London
British expatriates in Australia